Omair Essa (Arabic:عمير عيسى; born 3 April 1995) is a Qatari footballer who plays as a midfielder.

Career
Omair Essa started his career at Qatar SC and is a product of the Qatar's youth system. On 4 August 2018, Omair Essa made his professional debut for Qatar SC against Al-Gharafa in the Pro League, replacing Ali Awadh Boujalouf .

External links

References

Living people
1995 births
Qatari footballers
Qatar SC players
Qatar Stars League players
Association football midfielders
Place of birth missing (living people)